Song of Songs is a 2005 film directed by Josh Appignanesi and written by Josh Appignanesi and Jay Basu.  It stars Natalie Press and Joel Chalfen.  Press plays a devoutly orthodox Jewish young woman who tries to bring her estranged, secular brother back into the fold.

Made in the UK, it was released there in February 2006 after winning a special commendation for Best British Film at the Edinburgh International Film Festival 2005 and a nomination for the Tiger Awards at the International Film Festival Rotterdam (2006).  The film was produced by Gayle Griffiths who won the Alfred Dunhill UK Talent Film Award at the London Film Festival 2005 for the production.

External links
 

2005 films
2005 drama films
Films about Jews and Judaism
Incest in film
British drama films
2000s British films